Durgeshwar Lal is an Indian politician and member of legislative assembly representing Purola Assembly constituency.

Durgeshwar Lal was elected as the member of Uttarakhand Legislative Assembly in 2022 Uttarakhand Legislative Assembly election. He defeated Malchand of the Indian National Congress by 6029 votes.

Recently in 2022, Uttarakhand SDM lodged a police complaint against Durgeshwar Lal at Purola Police Station  accusing him of uploading misleading posts.

References

Uttarakhand MLAs 2022–2027
Year of birth missing (living people)
Living people